The persecution of Christians by the Islamic State involves the systematic mass murder of Christian minorities, within the regions of Iraq, Syria, Egypt and Libya controlled by the Islamic terrorist group Islamic State. Persecution of Christian minorities climaxed following the Syrian civil war and later by its spillover.

According to US diplomat Alberto M. Fernandez, "While the majority of the victims of the conflict which is raging in Syria and Iraq have been Muslims, Christians have borne a heavy burden given their small numbers."

On February 3, 2016, the European Union recognized the persecution of religious minorities, including Christians, by the Islamic State as genocide. The vote was unanimous. The United States House of Representatives followed suit on March 15, 2016, declaring that these atrocities against minorities were genocide.  On April 20, 2016, the British Parliament unanimously voted to denounce the actions against minorities as genocide.

Background
The mass flight and expulsion of ethnic Assyrians from Iraq and Syria is a process which was initiated during the start of the 2003 invasion of Iraq by the US and the Multi-National Force and later it was initiated during the start of the Syrian civil war and the spillover. Leaders of Iraq's Assyrian community estimate that over two-thirds of the Iraqi Assyrian population may have fled the country or been internally displaced during the U.S.-led invasion which lasted from 2003 until 2011. Reports suggest that whole neighborhoods of Assyrians have cleared out in the cities of Baghdad and Basra, and that Sunni insurgent groups and militias have threatened Assyrian Christians. Following the campaign of the Islamic State in northern Iraq in August 2014, one quarter of the remaining Iraqi Assyrians fled the jihadists, finding refuge in neighbouring countries.

Timeline

Northern Iraq (2014)

After the fall of Mosul, ISIL demanded that Assyrian Christians living in the city convert to Islam, pay jizyah, or face execution, by July 19, 2014. ISIL leader Abu Bakr al-Baghdadi further noted that Christians who do not agree to follow those terms must "leave the borders of the Islamic Caliphate" within a specified deadline. This resulted in a complete Assyrian Christian exodus from Mosul, marking the end of 1,800 years of continuous Christian presence. A church mass was not held in Mosul for the first time in nearly 2 millennia.

In October 2014, a release put out by the Assyrian International News Agency stated that 200,000 Assyrians had been driven from their homes by the violence and become displaced.

ISIL has already set similar rules for Christians living in other cities and towns, including its de facto capital Raqqa.

ISIL had also been seen marking Christian homes with the letter nūn for Nassarah ("Christian"). Several religious buildings were seized and subsequently demolished, most notably Mar Behnam Monastery.

By August 7, ISIL captured the primarily Assyrian towns of Qaraqosh, Tel Keppe, Bartella, and Karamlish, prompting the residents to flee. More than 100,000 Iraqi Christians were forced to flee their homes and leave all their property behind after ISIL invaded Qaraqosh and surrounding towns in the Nineveh Plains Province of Iraq.

Libya (2015)

On February 12, 2015, the ISIL released a report in their online magazine Dabiq showing photos of 21 Egyptian Copts migrant workers that they had kidnapped in the city of Sirte, Libya, and whom they threatened to kill to "avenge the [alleged] kidnapping of Muslim women by the Egyptian Coptic Church". The men, who came from different villages in Egypt, 13 of them from Al-Our, Minya Governorate, were kidnapped in Sirte in two separate attacks on December 27, 2014, and in January 2015.

Syria (2015)

On 23 February 2015, in response to a major Kurdish offensive in the Al-Hasakah Governorate, ISIL abducted 150 Assyrians from villages near Tell Tamer in northeastern Syria, after launching a large offensive in the region.

According to US diplomat Alberto M. Fernandez, of the 232 of the Assyrians kidnapped in the ISIL attack on the Assyrian Christian farming villages on the banks of the Khabur River in Northeast Syria, 51 were children and 84 were women. "Most of them remain in captivity, with one account claiming that ISIS is demanding $22 million (or roughly $100,000 per person) for their release."

On 8 October 2015, ISIL released a video showing three of the Assyrian men kidnapped in Khabur being murdered. It was reported that 202 of the 253 kidnapped Assyrians were still in captivity, each one with a demanded ransom of $100,000.

Egypt (2018) 

On 2 November. 2018, Islamic State gunmen killed at least seven Coptic Christian pilgrims in Egypt on Friday and wounded at least 16 in an attack.  In April 2021, Islamic State gunmen executed a Christian businessman who was kidnapped in Egypt's Sinai.

Reactions

On 2 and 3 August 2014, thousands of Assyrians of the diaspora protested the persecution of their fellow Assyrians within Iraq and Syria, demanding a United Nations-led creation of a safe haven for minorities in the Nineveh Plains.

In October 2014, Kurdish-Danish human rights activist Widad Akrawi dedicated her 2014 International Pfeffer Peace Award "to all victims of persecution, particularly the Yazidis, the Christians, and all residents of the Kobanê region."  Chaldean Catholic Father Douglas Al-Bazi has spoken out strongly against the genocide.

In December 2015, at a town hall event, the 67th United States Secretary of State, Hillary Clinton, called the systematic persecution a genocide. The same month, David Greene, a radio journalist at NPR, stated that around 1,000 Christians had been killed "in areas where Islamic State fighters are targeting religious minorities", without specifying a source.

In February 2016, Lars Adaktusson, a Swedish member of the European Parliament from the EPP Group, said of the unanimous vote to recognize atrocities as genocide: "It gives the victims of the atrocities a chance to get their human dignity restored. It's also a historical confirmation that the European Parliament recognized what is going on and that they are suffering from the most despicable crime in the world, namely genocide."

See also

References

 
2010s in Asia
21st-century Eastern Orthodoxy
21st-century Oriental Orthodoxy
Persecution of Christians
Christianity in the Arab world
Persecution of Christians in Iraq
Christianity in Libya
History of Christianity in Syria
Christianity in the Middle East
Ethnic cleansing by the Islamic State of Iraq and the Levant
Forced migration
Islam-related controversies
Persecution of Assyrians by ISIL
Persecution of Copts by ISIL
Racism in the Arab world
Terrorism in Iraq
Terrorism in Syria
Terrorism in the Arab world
Terrorism in Libya
Terrorism in the Middle East
People killed by the Islamic State of Iraq and the Levant
Violence against Christians
Massacres of Christians
Christians executed for refusing to convert to Islam
21st-century mass murder